Bluebird Records is a record label best known for its low-cost releases, primarily of kids' music, blues and jazz in the 1930s and 1940s. It was founded in 1932 as a lower-priced RCA Victor subsidiary label of RCA Victor. Bluebird became known for what came to be known as the "Bluebird sound", which influenced rhythm and blues and early rock and roll. It is currently owned by parent company Sony Music Entertainment.

History
The label was founded in 1932 as a division of RCA Victor by Eli Oberstein, an executive at the company. Bluebird competed with other budget labels at the time. Records were made quickly and cheaply. The "Bluebird sound" came from the session band that was used on many recordings to cut costs. The band included musicians such as Big Bill Broonzy, Roosevelt Sykes, Washboard Sam, and Sonny Boy Williamson. Many blues musicians were signed to RCA Victor and Bluebird by Lester Melrose, a talent scout and producer who had a virtual monopoly on the Chicago blues market. In these years, the Bluebird label became the home of Chicago blues.

Bluebird recorded and reissued jazz and big band music. Its roster included Ted Weems, Rudy Vallée, Joe Haymes, Artie Shaw, Glenn Miller, Shep Fields, and Earl Hines. During World War II, Victor reissued records by Duke Ellington, Jelly Roll Morton, and Bennie Moten. Bluebird's roster for country music included the Monroe Brothers, the Delmore Brothers, Bradley Kincaid. It reissued many titles by Jimmie Rodgers and the Carter Family.

After World War II, the Bluebird label was retired and its previously released titles were reissued on the standard RCA Victor label. In the 1950s, RCA Victor revived Bluebird for certain budget recordings, jazz releases and reissues, children's records, and the low-priced RCA Victor Bluebird Classics series. The Bluebird name was retired again during the 1960s, and certain recordings issued during the 1950s under the imprint were transferred to the low-priced RCA Camden label. In the mid-1970s, the label was again reactivated by RCA for a series of 2-LP sets of big band, swing and jazz reissues produced by Frank Driggs and Ethel Gabriel. Currently, the Bluebird label is used for CD reissues of certain jazz and pop titles originally issued on the RCA Victor label.

Labels and discs

RCA Victor's entry into the budget market was the 35¢ Timely Tunes, sold through Montgomery Ward retail stores. 40 issues appeared from April to July 1931 before the label was discontinued.

The first Bluebird records appeared in July 1932 along with identically numbered Electradisk records. Test-marketed at selected Woolworth's stores in New York City, these 8-inch discs are so rare today that some issues may no longer exist at all. They may have sold for as little as 10¢. Bluebird records bore a black-on-medium blue label, Electradisks a blue-on-orange label.

The 8-inch series ran from 1800 to 1809, but both labels reappeared later in 1932 as 10-inch discs: Bluebird 1820–1853, continuing to April 1933, and Electradisk 2500–2509 and 1900–2177, continuing to January 1934.

Electradisks in the 2500 block were dance-band sides recorded on two days in June 1932. These rare issues were given Victor matrix numbers, but the four-digit matrix numbers on the 78 look more like those found on discs from Crown Records, an independent label that had its own studios, though its products were pressed by Victor. The few records in that block that have been seen resemble Crowns, leading to speculation that all were recorded at Crown. The 2500 series may also have been for sale only in New York City.

In May 1933 RCA Victor restarted Bluebird as a 35¢ (3 for $1) general-interest budget record, numbered B-5000 and up, with a new blue-on-beige label (often referred as the "buff" Bluebird, used until 1937 in the US and 1939 in Canada). Most 1800-series material was immediately reissued on the buff label; afterwards it ran concurrently with the Electradisk series (made for Woolworth's).

Another short-lived concurrent label was Sunrise, which may have been made for sale by artists or "mom & pop" stores. Few discs, and essentially no information, survive. Sunrise and Electradisk were discontinued early in 1934, leaving Bluebird as RCA's only budget-priced label until RCA Camden was formed. RCA Victor also produced a separate Montgomery Ward label for the Ward stores.

Notable artists

Charlie Barnet
Big Bill Broonzy
Willie Bryant
Bo Carter
Wilf Carter
Virgil Childers
Arthur Crudup
Billy Daniels
Sam Donahue
Shep Fields
Harry Gozzard
Lil Green
George Hall
Lionel Hampton
Joe Haymes
Fletcher Henderson
Earl Hines
Dan Hornsby
The Ink Spots
Curtis Jones
Spike Jones
The King Sisters

Vincent Lopez
Bert Lown
J. E. Mainer
Wingy Manone
Tommy McClennan
Big Maceo Merriweather
Glenn Miller
Mississippi Matilda
Vaughn Monroe
Ozzie Nelson
Sonny Boy Nelson
Jimmie Rodgers
Tampa Red
John Serry Sr.
Artie Shaw
Dinah Shore
Ruby Smith
Roosevelt Sykes
Rudy Vallee
Washboard Sam
Cy Walter
Ted Weems
Sonny Boy Williamson I

See also
 List of record labels

References

Further reading
 The American Record Label Book by Brian Rust (Arlington House Publishers, 1978)
 American Record Labels and Companies - An Encyclopedia (1891–1943) by Allan Sutton & Kurt Nauck (Mainspring Press, 2000)
 The Victor Master Book, Vol. 2, by Brian Rust (Walter Allen, 1974)

External links
The Online 78rpm Discography Project
The 78rpm Home Page: Label Types of Bluebird Records
Russell, Tony, and Bob Pinson. Country Music Records: A Discography 1921-1942. Nashville: Country Music Hall of Fame, 2004.
Bluebird Records on the Internet Archive's Great 78 Project

American record labels
Jazz record labels
RCA Records